Bernard Collery (1838 – 5 July 1907) was an Irish businessman and politician.

He was a member of Sligo Borough Council and Mayor of the city from 1882 to 1884. In 1882, he presented the city with a Mayor's chain of office, which is still used today.

In 1891 he was nominated as candidate of the Anti-Parnellite Irish National Federation faction of the Irish Parliamentary Party in a by-election in North Sligo. He won by a substantial majority over the Parnellite candidate, and remained as member for North Sligo until resigning in late January 1900.

Endnotes

External links 

1838 births
1907 deaths
Irish Parliamentary Party MPs
Members of the Parliament of the United Kingdom for County Sligo constituencies (1801–1922)
UK MPs 1886–1892
UK MPs 1892–1895
UK MPs 1895–1900
Anti-Parnellite MPs